Sheikh (Rabbi) Ganzibra Dakhil Aidan (also spelled Dakheel Edan or Dakhil Idan) (born April 14, 1881, died June 24, 1964) was the patriarch and international head of the Mandaean religion from 1917, until his death in 1964. The mandi (beth manda) in Liverpool, Sydney, Australia is named in his honor (Ganzibra Dakhil Mandi).

Biography
Dakhil Aidan was born on April 14, 1881 in the city of Amarah in Maysan Governorate, southern Iraq. He belonged to the Manduia lineage, a long line of Mandaean religious leaders. He was a fluent speaker of the Arabic and Mandaic languages. His father, Sheikh Aidan (also known as Adam, son of Mhatam Yuhana), died in Nasiriyah when he was 12 years old. In 1904, he became a tarmida (junior priest) in Nasiriyah at the age of 23. In 1917, he was appointed as Ganzibra (head-priest) of the Mandaean community. Dakhil Aidan also became a member of the Nasiriyah municipal council in 1920. His malwasha (Mandaean baptismal name) was Mhatam Zihrun, son of Adam (Mhatam Zihrun bar Adam).

Dakhil Aidan was also a copyist. In 1898 and also in 1935, he copied the Ginza Rabba. The 1898 Ginza is currently used by the Mandaean community in Australia, while the 1935 Ginza was given to Lamea Abbas Amara in San Diego, United States.

Ganzibra Dakhil Aidan died on June 24, 1964 at his home in the Al-Dora suburb of Baghdad.

Family
Dakhil Aidan's sister's daughter was the poet Lamea Abbas Amara, who lived much of her life in San Diego, United States. When he was near his death in June 1964, he bequeathed some of his manuscripts to Lamea Abbas Amara.

His father was Sheikh Aidan (baptismal name: Adam bar Mhatam Yuhana), while his paternal grandfather was Mhatam Yuhana (also known as Sheikh Damouk).

See also
Sattar Jabbar Hilo, the current Mandaean patriarch
Jabbar Choheili, a former Mandaean patriarch of Ahvaz, Iran
Yahya Bihram, a 19th-century Mandaean priest (from Iraq)
Lamia Abbas Amara, niece

References

1881 deaths
1964 deaths
Mandaean priests
Iraqi Mandaeans
Iraqi religious leaders
People from Amarah
People from Nasiriyah
Iraqi scribes